Malone Township is located in Tazewell County, Illinois. As of the 2010 census, its population was 220 and it contained 95 housing units. Malone Township formed from Delavan Township in November, 1854.

Geography

Demographics

References

External links
City-data.com
Illinois State Archives

Townships in Tazewell County, Illinois
Peoria metropolitan area, Illinois
Townships in Illinois